The Leica CL is an APS-C mirrorless system camera announced by Leica Camera AG in November, 2017.

The CL is a member of Leica's L-mount family of cameras, which began with the discontinued T/TL, and is currently shared with the TL2 and SL cameras. It shares the same sensor as the TL2, and is primarily differentiated from its sister model by its user interface, which focuses on physical controls as opposed to touchscreen, and presence of an integrated viewfinder.

References

Leica CL (2017)
Cameras introduced in 2017